Saúl Fortunato Ongaro (24 August 1916 – 23 April 2004) was an Argentine footballer who played as a defender for clubs in Argentina and Chile. He made two appearances for the Argentina national team in 1946.

Teams
 Estudiantes de La Plata 1937–1938
 Argentino de Quilmes 1939
 Estudiantes de La Plata 1939–1946
 Racing Club 1947–1950
 Universidad de Chile 1951–1952
 Gimnasia y Esgrima de La Plata 1953–1955

References

External links
 
 
 

2004 deaths
1916 births
Argentine footballers
Association football defenders
Argentina international footballers
Club de Gimnasia y Esgrima La Plata footballers
Estudiantes de La Plata footballers
Racing Club de Avellaneda footballers
Universidad de Chile footballers
Argentine expatriate footballers
Argentine expatriate sportspeople in Chile
Expatriate footballers in Chile